Milan Radaković (born 28 January 1969) is a Yugoslav wrestler. He competed in the men's Greco-Roman 130 kg at the 1992 Summer Olympics.

References

1969 births
Living people
Yugoslav male sport wrestlers
Olympic wrestlers as Independent Olympic Participants
Wrestlers at the 1992 Summer Olympics
Place of birth missing (living people)